Rejji Kuruvilla is an Indian-American biologist. She is a professor of biology at Johns Hopkins School of Medicine.

Education 
Kuruvilla completed a bachelor of science at St. Xavier's College, Kolkata in 1987. In 1998, she earned a doctor of philosophy at University of Houston. Her dissertation was titled "Studies on arachidonic acid depletion in diabetic rat nerve and human Schwann cells cultured in elevated glucose." Her doctoral advisor was Joseph Eichberg. Kuruvilla completed postdoctoral research on neurotrophin signaling in sympathetic neurons at Johns Hopkins School of Medicine in the lab of David Ginty.

Career 
Kuruvilla is a professor of biology at Johns Hopkins School of Medicine. She researches the sympathetic nervous system development and functions. Her studies explore endocytic trafficking of neurotrophins in nervous system maintenance.

References

External links 

 

Living people
Year of birth missing (living people)
St. Xavier's College, Kolkata alumni
University of Houston alumni
Johns Hopkins University faculty
20th-century Indian women scientists
21st-century Indian women scientists
20th-century American biologists
21st-century American biologists
20th-century Indian biologists
21st-century Indian biologists
American women biologists
Indian women biologists
Indian expatriate academics
American people of Indian descent
American women academics
20th-century American women scientists
21st-century American women scientists